Glass databases are a collection of glass compositions, glass properties, glass models, associated trademark names, patents etc. These data were collected from publications in scientific papers and patents, from personal communication with scientists and engineers, and other relevant sources.

History
Since the beginning of scientific glass research in the 19th century thousands of glass property-composition datasets were published. The first attempt to summarize all those data systematically was the monograph "Glastechnische Tabellen". World War II and the Cold War prevented similar efforts for many years afterwards. In 1956 "Phase Diagrams for Ceramists" was published the first time, containing a collection of phase diagrams. This database is known today as "Phase Equilibria Diagrams". In 1991 the Japanese database Interglad was created, followed by the publication of the "Handbook of Glass Data" in 1993. The "Handbook of Glass Data" was later digitalized and substantially expanded under the name SciGlass. Currently, SciGlass contains properties of about 350,000 glass compositions, INTERGLAD about 300,000, and "Phase Equilibria Diagrams" includes about 20,000 diagrams.

Glass database contents
The following list of glass database contents is not complete, and it may not be up to date. For full features see the references section below. All databases contain citations to the original data sources and the chemical composition of the glasses or ceramics.
SciGlass: Viscosity, density, mechanical properties, optical properties (including optical spectra), thermal expansion and other thermal properties, electrical properties, chemical durability, liquidus temperatures, crystallization characteristics, ternary diagrams of glass formation, glass property calculation methods, patent and trademark index, subject index etc.
Interglad: Viscosity, density, mechanical properties, optical properties, electrical properties, statistical analysis, liquidus temperatures, ternary property diagrams
Phase Equilibria Diagrams: Phase diagrams,  including liquidus and solidus temperatures, eutectic points, crystalline phases, primary crystalline phases

Application
Experimental planning, expected properties and appropriate glass compositions can be estimated from similar data.
Calculation of glass properties based on many independent data sources.
Scientific understanding of glass composition-property relations.
Design of glass compositions that are not patented by the competition.
System design and optimization including design for purpose and design for cost.

References

Glass engineering and science
Glass chemistry
Chemical databases
Ceramic materials